Swimming at the 2018 Asian Games was held at the Gelora Bung Karno Aquatic Stadium in Gelora Bung Karno Sports Complex, Jakarta, Indonesia, from 19 to 24 August 2018.

The winning team Japan collected almost quarter of its total gold medals in this edition from swimming events only.

Schedule

Medalists

Men

Women

Mixed

Medal table

Participating nations
A total of 366 athletes from 39 nations competed in swimming at the 2018 Asian Games:

References

External links
Swimming at the 2018 Asian Games
Official Result Book – Swimming

 
2018 Asian Games events
Asian Games
2018
2018 Asian Games
International aquatics competitions hosted by Indonesia